Carles Soria Grau (born 8 October 1996) is a Spanish professional footballer who plays as a right back for Super League Greece club PAS Giannina.

Club career
Born in Calaf, Barcelona, Catalonia, Soria joined RCD Espanyol's youth setup in 2009, from Club Gimnàstic Manresa. On 4 June 2015, after finishing his graduation, he was promoted to the reserves in Segunda División B.

Soria made his senior debut on 23 August 2015, replacing Adrián Dalmau in a 1–0 victory against UE Lleida. His first senior goal came the following 14 February, netting his team's only in a 1–3 home loss CD Atlético Baleares.

On 4 April 2016, Soria's contract was extended until the end of 2018. On 1 June 2017, he moved abroad for the first time in his career, signing a two-year deal with Cypriot First Division club AEK Larnaca FC.

Soria made his professional debut on 20 December 2017, coming on as a late substitute for compatriot Joan Tomàs in a 0–0 draw at AEL Limassol. His first goal for the club occurred on 13 May of the following year, in a 3–2 home defeat of the same opponent; late in the month, however, he was released by the club.

On 21 June 2018, Soria returned to Espanyol and its B-team, signing a two-year contract.

PAS Giannina
In summer 2022 he moved to PAS Giannina in Super League Greece.

Club statistics

Honours
AEK Larnaca
 Cypriot Cup: 2017–18

Estoril

 Segunda Liga: 2020–21

References

External links

1996 births
Living people
People from Anoia
Sportspeople from the Province of Barcelona
Spanish footballers
Footballers from Catalonia
Association football defenders
RCD Espanyol B footballers
AEK Larnaca FC players
G.D. Estoril Praia players
PAS Giannina F.C. players
Segunda División B players
Cypriot First Division players
Liga Portugal 2 players
Primeira Liga players
Super League Greece players
Spanish expatriate footballers
Expatriate footballers in Cyprus
Spanish expatriate sportspeople in Cyprus
Expatriate footballers in Portugal
Spanish expatriate sportspeople in Portugal
Expatriate footballers in Greece
Spanish expatriate sportspeople in Greece